Clintondale High School is a school in Clinton Township, Macomb County, Michigan and a part of the Clintondale Community Schools.

Curriculum

Clintondale High School is a public school located in Clinton Township, Michigan. It has 390 students in grades 9–12 with a student-teacher ratio of 17 to 1.

References

External links
Clintondale High School

Public high schools in Michigan
Educational institutions established in 1956
Schools in Macomb County, Michigan
1956 establishments in Michigan